The Grand Cayman bullfinch (Melopyrrha taylori) is a threatened bird endemic to the island of Grand Cayman. It is the only bird species endemic to the Cayman Islands since the extinction of the Grand Cayman thrush (Turdus ravidus), though several bird subspecies are also endemic.

Taxonomy
It was once considered a subspecies of the Cuban bullfinch (M. nigra) as M. nigra taylori. It can be distinguished from the Cuban bullfinch by its slightly larger bill size and the much paler coloration of the female bird.

Conservation
Its population is declining due to invasive mammals. Habitat fragmentation may also be a potential major risk, though currently this is very low.

References 

Endemic birds of the Caribbean
Endemic fauna of the Cayman Islands
Birds of the Cayman Islands
Birds described in 1896
Taxa named by Ernst Hartert
Melopyrrha